The Red Randall series was a 1940s, boys war adventure series by R. Sidney Bowen. Like the Dave Dawson War Adventure Series the series pertained to World War II specifically the Pacific Theatre of the war. The main character, Red Randall serves throughout the book series as a military aviator. The books contain frequent deviation from history, such as a Fifth Column Japanese base on the Hawaiian Islands, during the air raid on Pearl Harbor.

Red Randall Series

See also

American children's novels
Series of children's books
Novels set during World War II
Aviation novels
American novel series
1940s children's books